Georg Diederichs (2 September 1900 – 19 June 1983) was a German politician, a member of the SPD, who served as Minister President of Lower Saxony from 1961 to 1970.

He was born at Northeim and died in Hanover.

1900 births
1983 deaths
People from Northeim
Presidents of the German Bundesrat
Social Democratic Party of Germany politicians
Ministers-President of Lower Saxony
Grand Crosses 1st class of the Order of Merit of the Federal Republic of Germany
Members of Parlamentarischer Rat